San Bartolomé Parish is the Catholic church and parish house of the people of Hueypoxtla. Has always belonged to the Diocese of Cuautitlán in Mexico. This colonial building is a monument of great architectural importance dedicated to Saint Bartholomew.

History
In 1934 was discovered a gate catacombs with 72 crypts under the floor inside the temple, the tombs belong to, mostly moneyed Spaniards who lived around the village of Hueypoxtla during 16th-19th centuries, there are also bones of indigenous people as a child, according to the book of deaths.

References

External links
 San Bartolomé Hueypoxtla. 

1593 establishments in North America
Spanish Colonial architecture in Mexico
Roman Catholic churches in Mexico
Franciscan churches in Mexico
Spanish Catholic Evangelisation in Teotlalpan
Hueypoxtla